Long as You're Living is a live album by American jazz drummer Max Roach, featuring tracks recorded in West Germany in 1960 and released on the Enja label.

Reception

Allmusic awarded the album 3 stars, with the review by Scott Yanow stating: "Although the playing of The Turrentines is not at the same innovative level as Roach's prior group with Booker Little and George Coleman, they come up with consistently fresh statements during the well-rounded set and the tenorman was already instantly recognizable."

Track listing
All compositions by Max Roach except as indicated
 "Lotus Blossom" (Kenny Dorham) - 7:33     
 "Drum Conversation" - 6:55     
 "The Villa" (Dorham) - 7:39     
 "Long as You're Living" (Julian Priester, Tommy Turrentine) - 10:27     
 "A Night in Tunisia" (Dizzy Gillespie, Frank Paparelli) - 12:07     
 "Prelude" (Consuela Lee) - 8:03 Bonus track on CD reissue     
 "Drum Talk" - 2:17 Bonus track on CD reissue

Personnel 
Max Roach - drums
Tommy Turrentine - trumpet
Julian Priester - trombone
Stanley Turrentine  - tenor saxophone
Bob Boswell - bass

References 

1984 live albums
Max Roach live albums
Enja Records live albums